Serrano Sport Club, commonly known as Serrano, is a Brazilian football club from Vitória da Conquista, Bahia state. They competed in the Série B once.

History
The club was founded on December 22, 1979. They won the Campeonato Baiano Second Level in 1992 and finishing as runners-up in the competition in 2010, gaining promotion to the 2011 Campeonato Baiano. They competed in the Série B in 1987.

Achievements
 Campeonato Baiano Second Level:
 Winners (1): 1992

Stadium
Serrano Sport Club play their home games at Estádio Lomanto Júnior, nicknamed Lomantão. The stadium has a maximum capacity of 12,500 people.

References

Association football clubs established in 1979
Football clubs in Bahia
1979 establishments in Brazil